Summer Night in Munich is a 1998 live album by Oscar Peterson released in 1999.

Track listing
 "Backyard Blues" – 6:56
 "When Summer Comes" – 9:06
 "Nigerian Marketplace" – 9:34
 "Evening Song" – 6:15
 "Satin Doll" (Duke Ellington, Billy Strayhorn, Johnny Mercer) – 8:20
 "Love Ballade" – 8:49
 "Hymn to Freedom" – 5:53
 "Sushi" – 8:05

All tracks composed by Oscar Peterson, unless otherwise noted.

Personnel

Performance
 Oscar Peterson – piano
 Ulf Wakenius - guitar
 Martin Drew – drums
 Niels-Henning Ørsted Pedersen – double bass

Production
 Michael Bishop - engineer
 Jack Renner
 Anilda Carrasquillo - artwork
 Edward Gajdel - photography
 Elaine Martone - production supervisor
 Alyn Shipton - liner notes
 Brian Sooy - cover design
 Robert Woods - executive producer

References

1999 live albums
Oscar Peterson live albums
Telarc Records live albums